The Bottle is a 1915 British silent drama film directed by Cecil M. Hepworth and starring Albert Chevalier, Stewart Rome and Alma Taylor. It was based on a play by Arthur Shirley.

Cast
 Albert Chevalier as Harry Ashford  
 Ivy Millais as Mary Ashford  
 Harry Brett as Jim Brewster  
 Stewart Rome as Barman 
 John MacAndrews 
 Alma Taylor

References

Bibliography
 Palmer, Scott. British Film Actors' Credits, 1895-1987. McFarland, 1988.

External links

1915 films
1915 drama films
British films based on plays
British drama films
British silent feature films
1910s English-language films
Films directed by Cecil Hepworth
Films set in England
Hepworth Pictures films
British black-and-white films
1910s British films
Silent drama films